The grapheme Ě, ě (E with caron) is used in Czech and Sorbian alphabets, in Pinyin, in Javanese, in Sundanese and in Proto-Slavic notation.

Czech

The letter ě is a vestige of Old-Czech palatalization.

This letter never appears in the initial position, and its pronunciation depends on the preceding consonant:
 Dě, tě, ně  is written instead of ďe, ťe, ňe (analogously to di, ti, ni).
 Bě, pě, vě, fě is written instead of bje, pje, vje, fje. But some words (vjezd, "entry, drive-in"; objem, "volume"), are written with bje, vje because –je- is part of the etymological root of the word, preceded by the prefix v- or ob-.
 Mě  is written instead of mňe. For etymological reasons, mně is written in some words (jemný, "soft" -> jemně, "softly").

Serbo-Croatian
The grapheme is sometimes used in Serbo-Croatian to denote a jat (něsam, věra, lěpo, pověst, tělo). It is pronounced in different ways depending on dialect: Ekavian (nesam, vera, lepo, povest, telo), Ikavian (nisam, vira, lipo, povist, tilo) or Ijekavian (nijesam, vjera, lijepo, povijest, tijelo). Historically its use was very widespread, but it gradually lost favour to combined j and e graphemes and it was eventually dropped from the Gaj's Latin alphabet; it is only found in scientific and historically accurate literature.

Chinese
Pinyin uses this ě (e caron), not the e breve (ĕ), to indicate the third tone of Mandarin Chinese.

Javanese
Javanese uses ě (e caron), to indicate pěpět (schwa) .

Sundanese
Same as Javanese, ě (e caron) in Sundanese also indicates pěpět (schwa) .

Encoding

Latin letters with diacritics